Pamela Yvonne Lavine (born 12 March 1969) is a Barbadian former cricketer who played as an all-rounder, batting right-handed and bowling right-arm medium-fast. She appeared in 24 One Day Internationals and 15 Twenty20 Internationals for the West Indies between 2005 and 2010. She played domestic cricket for Barbados.

References

External links

1969 births
Living people
West Indian women cricketers
West Indies women One Day International cricketers
West Indies women Twenty20 International cricketers
Barbadian women cricketers